
Year 338 (CCCXXXVIII) was a common year starting on Sunday (link will display the full calendar) of the Julian calendar. At the time, it was known as the Year of the Consulship of Ursus and Polemius (or, less frequently, year 1091 Ab urbe condita). The denomination 338 for this year has been used since the early medieval period, when the Anno Domini calendar era became the prevalent method in Europe for naming years.

Events 
 By place 
 Roman Empire 
 The Romans, allied with the Goths, arrive in the north of the Roman Empire to protect the Danube frontier.
 Emperor Constantius II intervenes against the Persians in Armenia. 

 Persia 
 Shapur II, king of the Persian Empire, begins a widespread persecution of Christians. He orders forcible conversions to the state religion, Zoroastrianism, lest the Christians disrupt his realm while he is away fighting the Romans in Armenia and Mesopotamia.

 Asia 
 Tuoba Yihuai, ruler of the Tuoba Dai clan, dies and is succeeded by his brother Tuoba Shiyijian. 

 By topic 
 Art 
 The Church of Santa Costanza, Rome, starts to be built (approximate date).

 Religion 
 Eusebius of Nicomedia becomes Patriarch of Constantinople, after Paul I is banished.
 Non-Christians are persecuted by the Roman Empire as pagans.

Births 
 Isaac the Great, Armenian catholicos (d. 439)

Deaths 
 Flavius Ablabius, Roman consul and politician
 Li Qi, Chinese emperor of Cheng Han (b. 314)
 Tuoba Yihuai, prince of the Tuoba Dai clan

References